James Thomas McHugh (January 3, 1932 – December 10, 2000) was an American prelate of the Catholic Church who served as bishop of Diocese of Rockville Centre in New York during the year 2000. 

McHugh previously served as an auxiliary bishop of the Archdiocese of Newark in New Jersey from 1987 to 1989, as bishop of the Diocese of Camden in New Jersey from 1989 to 1998 and as coadjutor bishop of Rockville Centre from 1998 to early 2000.

Biography

Early life 
James McHugh was born in Orange, New Jersey, to James T. and Caroline (née Scavone) McHugh. He received his early education at the parochial school of St. Venantius Parish, and attended Our Lady of the Valley High School in Orange. He attended Seton Hall University in South Orange, New Jersey, earning a Bachelor of Arts degree in classical languages. He then began his studies for the priesthood at Immaculate Conception Seminary in Darlington, New Jersey, receiving a Master of Divinity degree.

Priesthood
On May 25, 1957, McHugh was ordained a priest of the Archdiocese of Newark at the Cathedral of the Sacred Heart in Newark, New Jersey His first assignment was as a curate at Our Lady of Mount Carmel Parish in Newark, and he afterwards served at Holy Trinity Parish in Fort Lee, New Jersey. He served as a member of the Archdiocesan Family Life Committee from 1962 to 1965.

In addition to his pastoral duties, McHugh did graduate work in sociology at Fordham University in New York City from 1963 to 1965. He served as moderator of the Bergen County Catholic Physicians' Guild (1964–1965) and of the Bergen County Catholic Nurses' Council (1963–1965). He continued his studies in sociology at the Catholic University of America in Washington, D.C. from 1965 to 1967. In 1965, he joined the staff of the National Conference of Catholic Bishops, where he served as director of the Family Life Bureau (1965–1975), director of the National Right to Life Committee (1967), and of the Office of Pro-Life Activities (1972–1978). While in that position he caused controversy when, in response to President Richard Nixon's July 1969 proposal of federal funding of artificial contraception as a means of population control, McHugh said Nixon's message was "a positive and constructive approach to the problem."  He was named a papal chamberlain in 1971, and raised to the rank of honorary prelate in 1986.

McHugh was a visiting lecturer in theology at Princeton Theological Seminary (1974), Immaculate Conception Seminary (1976–81), and American College of Louvain in Belgium (1976). He became director of the Diocesan Development Program for Natural Family Planning in 1981. From 1978 to 1981, he studied moral theology with a concentration in medical ethics at the Pontifical University of St. Thomas Aquinas (Angelicum) in Rome where he earned a doctorate in theology. He then served as a visiting lecturer at the Pontifical Lateran University in 1982. He served as special assistant at the World Synod of Bishops on "The Christian Family in the Contemporary World" in 1980, and was appointed to the delegation of the Permanent Observer Mission of the Holy See to the United Nations in 1983. He was appointed archdiocesan vicar for Parish and Family Life in 1986.

Auxiliary Bishop of Newark 
On November 20, 1987, McHugh was appointed as an auxiliary bishop of Newark and titular bishop of Morosbisdus by Pope John Paul II. He received his episcopal consecration on January 25, 1988 from Archbishop Theodore Edgar McCarrick, with Archbishop Peter Leo Gerety and Bishop Walter William Curtis serving as co-consecrators, at the Cathedral of the Sacred Heart. He selected as his episcopal motto: Quid retribuam Domino, meaning, "What shall I return to the Lord".

Bishop of Camden
Following the retirement of Bishop George Guilfoyle, McHugh was named the fifth Bishop of Camden on May 13, 1989 by John Paul II. His installation took place at the Cathedral of the Immaculate Conception on June 20, 1989. During his nine-year tenure, he undertook a major reorganization of the diocese's administrative structure and authorized the relocation of the diocesan headquarters to downtown Camden. He presided over a diocesan synod in September 1992. Highly dedicated to the cause of Catholic education, he created a $63 million Catholic Education Endowment Fund for schools and religious education programs, a five-point plan to reinvigorate Catholic high schools, and led a grassroots effort to support school choice legislation in the state legislature.

A strong opponent of abortion rights for women, McHugh was a leading member of the National Conference of Bishops' Pro-Life Committee, and was known as the "father of the pro-life movement in America." He served as a delegate at United Nations-sponsored conferences on the environment (1992 in Rio de Janeiro) and on population and development (1994 in Cairo).

Bishop of Rockville Centre
McHugh was appointed coadjutor bishop of the Diocese of Rockville Centre on December 7, 1998, effective February 22, 1999. He succeeded to the office of diocesan bishop by right of succession on January 4, 2000.

Death and legacy 
James McHugh died on December 10, 2000 in Rockville Centre, New York at age 68.

In November 2020, a Vatican investigation into the case of defrocked former cardinal Theodore McCarrick identified McHugh as one of three bishops who "provided inaccurate and incomplete information to the Holy See regarding McCarrick’s sexual conduct with young adults" when McCarrick was a candidate for archbishop of the Archdiocese of Washington in 2000.

References

1932 births
2000 deaths
20th-century Roman Catholic bishops in the United States
American anti-abortion activists
Seton Hall University alumni
Roman Catholic Archdiocese of Newark
Pontifical University of Saint Thomas Aquinas alumni
Catholic University of America alumni
People from Orange, New Jersey
People from Rockville Centre, New York
Roman Catholic bishops in New Jersey